Events from the year 1387 in Ireland.

Incumbent
Lord: Richard II

Events

Births

Deaths
 Richard Óg Burke, 2nd Clanricarde

 
1380s in Ireland
Ireland